Dutton Cars, based in Worthing, Sussex, England, was a maker of kit cars between 1970 and 1989. In terms of number of kits produced, it was the largest kit-car manufacturer in the world.

The company was founded by Tim Dutton-Woolley and run from a small workshop in which a series of cars named P1 was built. In October 1971, the B-Type appeared with a more or less standard specification and based on Triumph Herald components. A move was also made to a larger factory in Tangmere, Chichester.

Products 
Most Duttons depended on a ladder-frame chassis built from steel profiles, which held the various parts taken from the donor car. After originally using Triumph Herald parts, most Duttons built used Ford Escort Mk 1 or Mk 2 components.

The B-Type eventually evolved into the Dutton Phaeton. Later versions of the Phaeton were based on Ford Escort components and were produced until 1989.

In 1979, Dutton launched the Dutton Sierra, an Escort-based estate car with off-road looks. Three years later, the Ford Motor Company decided to use the Sierra name on their Cortina/Taunus replacement, and served Dutton with a legal writ demanding that they stop using the name. At a case in the High Court in London, though, Dutton won the right to continue with the name on kit cars, as the judge ruled that they were a separate category from assembled cars. The case was popularly portrayed as a "gritty David and Goliath battle", and provided Dutton with some welcome publicity. The Sierra was Dutton's best seller for many years, production reaching a peak of 22 cars a week. The model was withdrawn in 1989. A further move to larger premises back in Worthing was made in 1982 with glass-fibre body making at a separate works in Lancing.

On the usual rear-wheel-drive  Escort underpinnings, Dutton placed the body of the new Rico. It made its debut in October 1984, at the Birmingham Motor Show. It used the mechanical parts and doors from a two-door Escort but had a Dutton-developed glass-fibre body over a steel tubular frame.

By 1984, 80 people were employed spread over four factories and a large showroom in Worthing – production topped 1,000 a year. By 1989, Tim Dutton had become bored with the kit-car scene and all the designs were sold. A new model had been developed called the Maroc, a heavily modified Ford Fiesta with a convertible body. Initially, it was available as a factory-finished car, but prices became too high, and from 1993, kit versions were made available. The design has been sold on to Novus of Bolney, Sussex; availability continued until at least 2006.

After leaving the kit-car business, Tim Dutton operated as a consultant, but returned to the automobile-making business in 1995 with the Dutton Mariner and Dutton Commander, amphibious cars based on the Ford Fiesta and Suzuki Samurai. The Dutton Surf, based on the current Suzuki Jimny, was introduced in 2005. Tim Dutton is now a record holder as the only person to have crossed the English Channel twice in an amphibious car.

Early Dutton kits are now hard to obtain. Most Duttons have already been assembled and are only available to purchase as second-hand cars, usually in need of some restoration. When a Dutton is purchased in kit form, the person building needs a donor car, to provide the engine, gearbox, and many other essential components. Fords are the most common donor cars, especially for Duttons. Most people use donor cars that would no longer be roadworthy and use the spares to create a new kit car.

Models

References

External links 

 Dutton Owners' club
 Dutton Amphibian
 Tim Dutton

Worthing
Kit car manufacturers
Companies based in West Sussex
Defunct motor vehicle manufacturers of the United Kingdom